Jerry L. Baldwin is an American college football coach. He served as the head football coach at the University of Louisiana at Lafayette from 1999 to 2001, compiling a record of 6–27. He was an assistant coach at Louisiana Tech University from 1982 to 1991 and Louisiana State University from 1992 to 1998.

Baldwin fired from his job at Louisiana–Lafayette following the 2001 season. In 2007, he was awarded $2 million by a jury in civil suit over his firing. The verdict was later reversed in an appeal. Baldwin now resides in Ruston, Louisiana, where he is a pastor at New Living Word Ministries and the principal of New Living Word school. He also coaches their football program.

Head coaching record

References

Year of birth missing (living people)
Living people
Louisiana Ragin' Cajuns football coaches
Louisiana Tech Bulldogs football coaches
LSU Tigers football coaches
Sportspeople from Natchez, Mississippi
African-American coaches of American football
People from Ruston, Louisiana
Coaches of American football from Mississippi
20th-century African-American sportspeople
21st-century African-American sportspeople